Churayevo is a rural locality (a selo) and the administrative center of Churayevskoye Rural Settlement, Shebekinsky District, Belgorod Oblast, Russia. The population was 758 as of 2010. There are 15 streets.

Geography 
Churayevo is located 11 km north of Shebekino (the district's administrative centre) by road. Koshlakovo is the nearest rural locality.

References 

Rural localities in Shebekinsky District